Pardosa subalpina is a species of wolf spider found in Switzerland.

See also 
 List of Lycosidae species

References

External links 

subalpina
Spiders of Europe
Spiders described in 1918